The following highways are numbered 226:

Brazil
 BR-226

Canada
 Prince Edward Island Route 226
 Quebec Route 226

Costa Rica
 National Route 226

Japan
 Japan National Route 226

United States
 Arkansas Highway 226
 California State Route 226 (former)
 Florida State Road 226
 Georgia State Route 226 (former)
Hawaii Route 226 (former)
 Illinois Route 226 (former)
Kentucky Route 226
 Maine State Route 226
 Minnesota State Highway 226
 Montana Secondary Highway 226
 Nevada State Route 226
 New Mexico State Road 226
 New York State Route 226
 North Carolina Highway 226
 North Carolina Highway 226A
 Ohio State Route 226
 Oregon Route 226
 Pennsylvania Route 226
 Tennessee State Route 226
 Texas State Highway 226 (former)
 Texas State Highway Loop 226
 Texas State Highway Spur 226
 Utah State Route 226
 Virginia State Route 226
 Wyoming Highway 226 (former)